Gwladys Patience Épangue (born 15 August 1983 in Clichy-la-Garenne, France) is a French taekwondo athlete. Representing France at the 2005 World Taekwondo Championships in Madrid, she won the silver medal in the welterweight division, losing to Hwang Kyung-Seon from South Korea in the final. At the 2007 World Taekwondo Championships in Beijing, she won a silver medal, losing to Hwang in the final again.

Épangue represented her country in the –67 kg class at the 2008 Beijing Olympics and won a bronze medal.

In 2009, Épangue won her first World Championship gold medal in welterweight at the 2009 World Taekwondo Championships in Copenhagen, Denmark. In Round of 32, she edged out South Korean's favorite Park Hye-Mi, who demolished Icelandic champion Auður Jónsdóttir 22–1 in the first round, in overtime. In the semifinal match, Épangue beat European rival Sandra Šarić of Croatia, 2008 European Champion and 4-time World Championship medalist, 6–1.

Épangue withdrew from the 2012 Summer Olympics because of injury was replaced by her compatriot Anne-Caroline Graffe.

References

External links 
 Athlete Biography at beijing2008

French female taekwondo practitioners
Living people
French sportspeople of Cameroonian descent
1983 births
Taekwondo practitioners at the 2004 Summer Olympics
Taekwondo practitioners at the 2008 Summer Olympics
Olympic bronze medalists for France
Olympic taekwondo practitioners of France
Olympic medalists in taekwondo
Medalists at the 2008 Summer Olympics
Knights of the Ordre national du Mérite
Taekwondo practitioners at the 2015 European Games
European Games medalists in taekwondo
European Games gold medalists for France
Taekwondo practitioners at the 2016 Summer Olympics
Universiade medalists in taekwondo
Universiade bronze medalists for France
European Taekwondo Championships medalists
World Taekwondo Championships medalists
Medalists at the 2003 Summer Universiade
Medalists at the 2005 Summer Universiade
Medalists at the 2009 Summer Universiade
20th-century French women
21st-century French women